Polichne may refer to:
Polichne (Chios), a town of ancient Chios, Greece
Polichne (Crete), a town of ancient Crete, Greece
Polichne (Ionia), a town of ancient Ionia, now in Turkey
Polichne (Megaris), a town of ancient Megaris, Greece
Polichne (Messenia), a town of ancient Messenia, Greece
Polichne (Naxos), a town of ancient Naxos, Greece
Polichne (Troad), a town of the ancient Troad, now in Turkey

See also
Polichna (disambiguation)